Matheus Gabriel Guedes Caetano (born 3 December 1999), known as Matheus Guedes, is a Brazilian footballer who plays as a central defender for Grêmio Anápolis.

Career

Santos
Born in Rondonópolis, Mato Grosso, Guedes joined Santos' youth setup in 2012 at the age of 13. On 22 March 2016, after being linked to English and Italian clubs, he signed his first professional contract after agreeing to a three-year deal.

On 21 November 2017, Guedes was called up to the first team by manager Elano, mainly due to squad shortage. In January 2018, he was promoted to the main squad by new manager Jair Ventura.

Guedes made his senior debut on 12 September 2018, coming on as a second-half substitute in a 2–1 Copa Paulista away loss against Taubaté. The following 15 March, he refused a contract renewal from the club, after having offers from Europe.

Portimonense
On 10 June 2019, it was reported that Guedes agreed to a contract with Roma, after his deal with Santos expired. However, the deal never materialized, and he signed a four-year contract with Portuguese Primeira Liga side Portimonense on 24 September.

However, Guedes only featured for Portimonense's under-23 squad during his spell.

Grêmio Anápolis
On 2 January 2023, Guedes signed for Grêmio Anápolis.

Career statistics

References

External links

1999 births
Living people
People from Mato Grosso
Brazilian footballers
Association football defenders
Santos FC players
Portimonense S.C. players
Grêmio Esportivo Anápolis players
Brazilian expatriate footballers
Brazilian expatriate sportspeople in Portugal
Expatriate footballers in Portugal